Stickley is a surname. Notable people with the surname include:

Arnold Stickley (1926–1998), English golfer
Gustav Stickley (1858–1942), American furniture manufacturer, design leader, and publisher
Jim Stickley, American businessman
Jon Stickley, American guitarist